The Berlin Crucifixion is a tempera and gold on panel painting that was created  and is attributed to Giotto. It is stored at the Gemäldegalerie in Berlin.

History
The first studies of the Berlin Crucifixion by Wilhelm von Bode attributed the work to Giotto. Following critics, like Roberto Longhi in 1948, have doubted the attribution. Others like William Suida, Pietro Toesca, and Richard Offner theorized a "Master of the Strasbourg Crucifixion", placing the Berlin Crucifixion in relation with other similar small-format works. , on the other hand, believed it to be the work of follower of Giotto.

Description
The cross of Jesus is lifted from the center of the painting in hieratic splendor from a uniform gold ground. Sorrowful angels surround the figure of Christ, while Mary Magdalene (in a red dress) embraces the base of the cross. 

Two groups gather at the painting's sides, leaving the center with Christ isolated. At left, the group of women surrounds Mary, who is fainting, and a young girl looks at her worried. Saint John the Baptist stands at right, with a man on horseback who is raising his arm, a traditional gesture made by those recognizing Jesus as the son of God. 

In the depiction, Jesus is thin, almost filament-like. The figures at the sides of the painting are cut off, giving the impression of a crowd of people larger than those represented.

Bibliography

See also
 
 Strasbourg Crucifixion
 Life of Christ

External links
 

Paintings by Giotto
Paintings in the Gemäldegalerie, Berlin
1320s paintings
Paintings depicting the Crucifixion of Jesus
Paintings depicting Mary Magdalene